Gendry is a fictional character in the A Song of Ice and Fire series of epic fantasy novels by American author George R. R. Martin, and its HBO television adaptation Game of Thrones.

First appearing in 1996's A Game of Thrones, Gendry is a blacksmith apprentice in King's Landing, and an unacknowledged bastard of King Robert Baratheon.  He subsequently appeared in A Clash of Kings (1998), A Storm of Swords (2000) and A Feast for Crows (2005).  After Queen Cersei Lannister orders the execution of all of King Robert's bastards, Gendry is forced to flee King's Landing alongside Arya Stark under the protection of Yoren, a recruiter for the Night's Watch.  He later joins the outlaw group Brotherhood Without Banners and is knighted by its leader Beric Dondarrion, and becomes a follower of R'hllor.

Gendry is portrayed by English actor Joe Dempsie in the HBO television adaptation.

Character description 
Gendry was conceived and born in King's Landing after Robert's Rebellion ended and is one of sixteen (twenty in the television series) bastard children of King Robert Baratheon.  He is fourteen years old when introduced in the first book, and is portrayed as tall and very muscled, having blue eyes and thick black hair, very similar to his biological father Robert in youth.  He also looks hauntingly like a younger version of Renly Baratheon, though with a squarer jaw, bushier brows and tangled hair, but resembles his biological uncle enough that for a moment Brienne of Tarth almost mistook him for the deceased Renly.  Gendry is an intelligent boy despite being born into poverty, but is also stubborn, sullen, suspicious, easily confused and shy around women, and Arya Stark commented that he looks pained when he tries to think.

Despite being one of the only four surviving biological children of King Robert (along with Mya Stone, Edric Storm and Bella Rivers), Gendry never knew who his father was, though he did see Robert from afar multiple times and was once nearly trampled by a drunken Robert's horse while playing near the city gate.  His mother was reported to have been an alehouse worker who died when Gendry was still a young boy, and all he remembers of her was that she had blonde hair.  Later on, Tobho Mott, a master armourer from Qohor working in King's Landing, was offered double the customary fee by a "lord" with concealed identity to take Gendry in as a smith apprentice, but accepted him for free after being impressed by the boy's physique.  Gendry turns out to be a talented apprentice, and likes to spend time polishing a bull head helmet that he proudly made for himself, which earned him the nickname "Bull" by fellow orphan boy Lommy Greenhands.

Storylines 

Gendry is not a point of view character in the novels, and his actions are witnessed and interpreted primarily through the eyes of Arya Stark, as well as some descriptions from Eddard Stark and Brienne of Tarth.  He has by far the most story arc out of King Robert's children.

A Game of Thrones 

In his investigation about the death of Jon Arryn, Eddard Stark meets several people who had met with Arryn shortly before his death.  One of them is Gendry, who was sought by both Jon Arryn and Stannis Baratheon. Eddard immediately recognizes Gendry as a  bastard child of King Robert Baratheon, and tells Tobho Mott that if Gendry ever shows interest in military service, he is to be sent directly to Eddard.  Gendry has shown promise as a blacksmith and made a helmet in the shape of a bull head.  Eddard compliments the helmet, offering to purchase it, but Gendry refuses, to the embarrassment of his master.

A Clash of Kings 

After King Robert's death and Eddard Stark's political fall and eventual public execution, Varys makes arrangements for the Night's Watch recruiter Yoren to take Gendry to the Wall in order to protect him from Queen Cersei's purge.  Gendry travels north with Yoren and thirty other recruits including Lommy Greenhands, Hot Pie and a disguised Arya Stark.  Not far from King's Landing they are stopped by several Gold Cloaks from the City Watch, who demand that Yoren give up Gendry as he is wanted by Queen Cersei.  Yoren refuses, and threatens off the Gold Cloaks with his recruits.

Later, near an abandoned holdfast by the God's Eye lake, the recruits are attacked by Lannister soldiers led by Ser Amory Lorch.  Yoren is killed in the fight, and Gendry along with Arya, Lommy and Hot Pie escape the burning holdfast through a secret tunnel. Whilst on a reconnaissance run with Arya, Gendry confronts her about her true gender and identity. He eventually has the truth out of her and is subsequently embarrassed by how crass he had spoken to her when she was in fact a highborn lady.  Gendry is later captured by Ser Gregor Clegane's soldiers, but is spared from death since his metalworking skill is useful as a slave laborer.  After Lannister man-at-arms Rafford kills the injured Lommy, they are taken to Harrenhal, where Gendry works as a smith.  When Arya decides to escape from Harrenhal, however, she persuades Gendry and Hot Pie to join her.

A Storm of Swords 

While wandering around the Riverlands looking for the direction of Riverrun, Arya, Gendry and Hot Pie are captured by the Brotherhood without Banners, led by a resurrected Beric Dondarrion.  At the Peach brothel in Stoney Sept, Gendry declines the seductive advance by Bella (his unknown half-sister), but later argues with Arya out of jealousy because she was talking to Beric's squire Edric Dayne, who claims to be Jon Snow's milk brother.  Gendry is later impressed with Thoros of Myr's description of the ideals of the brotherhood, and decides to join them.  He is knighted by Beric, thus becoming Ser Gendry, knight of the hollow hill.

A Feast for Crows 

While questing to find Sansa Stark, Brienne of Tarth encounters Gendry working as a smith at the Inn at the Crossroads along with a group of orphans, and is struck by his resemblance to the late Renly Baratheon. At the inn, Brienne encounters and duels with Rorge, killing him, only to be savaged by Biter;  Gendry saves Brienne's life by driving a spear through Biter's neck.

Family tree of House Baratheon

TV adaptation

Gendry is played by Joe Dempsie in the television adaption of the series of books. Explaining how he got cast for the role:
When I was cast as Gendry, I didn't have any of the physical attributes the part required. I was astounded that I got the role, to be honest. But David and Dan said, "We need to dye his hair black ... and it'd be great you hit the gym before we start filming." So I was told to get in shape.

Dempsie has received positive reviews for his performance as Gendry in the television series. He and the rest of the cast were nominated for Screen Actors Guild Awards for Outstanding Performance by an Ensemble in a Drama Series in 2014.

Season 1
Eddard "Ned" Stark tells the smith to send Gendry to him if he ever shows interest in wielding a sword. Gendry shows promise as a smith and makes a helmet in the shape of a bull's head; Eddard compliments the helmet, offering to purchase it. Gendry refuses, to the shame of the master smith. After Ned's arrest and eventual execution, arrangements are made for Yoren of the Night's Watch to take Gendry to the Wall with him.

Season 2
Gendry travels North with Yoren and other Night's Watch recruits, including Arya Stark (disguised as an orphan boy named 'Arry), Lommy Greenhands, Hot Pie and Jaqen H'ghar. During their journey, they are stopped by the Goldcloaks of the City Watch. They demand that Yoren hand Gendry over to them because King Joffrey has ordered that all of his father Robert's bastards be killed. Yoren turns the Goldcloaks away. Later, Gendry forces Arya to reveal her true identity, and is surprised to learn she is Ned Stark's daughter. After the Goldcloaks get help from Ser Amory Lorch and his men, they ambush the travelling party. In the chaos, Yoren is killed. Gendry's life is saved by Arya, who convinces the Goldcloaks that Lommy, who was killed during the attack, was Gendry. Gendry and the rest of the recruits are escorted to Harrenhal, the ruined castle-turned-prison. Ser Gregor Clegane oversees order here, and arbitrarily has many of the prisoners tortured and killed. Gendry is nearly tortured and killed but is saved by the arrival of Lord Tywin Lannister, who chides Clegane's men for their reckless treatment of the prisoners. Due to Jaqen H'ghar's help, Arya, Gendry and Hot Pie are able to escape Harrenhal.

Season 3
As they head towards the Riverlands, the group encounters the Brotherhood Without Banners, a group of outlaws who defend the weak. Inspired, Gendry decides to join the Brotherhood but is betrayed by them when they sell him to Lady Melisandre, as ordered by the Lord of Light. Melisandre later reveals to Gendry that the late King Robert was his father, and that she is bringing him to meet his uncle Stannis at Dragonstone. But in truth, Melisandre and Stannis plan to use Gendry's blood in a magic ritual to create a death curse on the usurpers to his throne, King Joffrey, the King in the North Robb Stark, and King of the Iron Islands Balon Greyjoy. Before they can sacrifice Gendry, Davos Seaworth helps him escape to King's Landing in a rowboat. Unable to swim or row competently, Gendry is nevertheless convinced that the Red Woman has a surer death in store for him, and returns to Westeros' capital by sea.

Season 7
In the years after his escape from Dragonstone, a series of events result in the deaths of the rest of House Baratheon, leaving Gendry as the only person with Baratheon heritage. Gendry returns to work as a blacksmith in King's Landing, hiding in plain sight from the Lannister soldiers and Goldcloaks. Although he reasons that the Lannisters will not think to look for him in the city, he grates at having to manufacture weapons for their army. Gendry is greeted by Davos, who has briefly returned to the capital to smuggle Tyrion to a secret meeting with Jaime and takes the opportunity to find Gendry. He wants Gendry's assistance in the coming war against the White Walkers. Gendry eagerly agrees. After meeting King in the North, Jon Snow, and bonding over their statuses as bastard sons of Robert Baratheon and (allegedly) Ned Stark respectively, they head north to Eastwatch-by-the-Sea. Gendry, alongside Jon, Tormund Giantsbane, Sandor Clegane, Beric Dondarrion, Thoros of Myr and Jorah Mormont, travel beyond the Wall to retrieve a wight to present as evidence to Cersei Lannister of the impending White Walker invasion. Gendry still resents Beric and Thoros for selling him. The group manages to capture a lone wight, but Jon realizes that the rest of the wights are approaching and orders Gendry to run back to Eastwatch to send a raven to Daenerys Targaryen requesting her assistance. After running through the night, Gendry collapses from exhaustion outside Eastwatch, but is rescued by Davos and a group of wildlings, managing to tell them of Jon's warning.

Season 8
Gendry joins Daenerys' army as they camp at Winterfell in anticipation of the White Walkers' attack. Gendry is tasked with smithing weapons from dragonglass, capable of killing the wights. Reunited with Arya, she bids him create a dual-bladed, dragonglass staff. On the eve of the attack, Gendry gives her the weapon and relates his Baratheon heritage to her. Arya inquires of his past romantic liaisons, then expresses her desire to lose her virginity, should they die tomorrow, and they make love. Gendry survives the Long Night and is legitimised a Baratheon by Daenerys, and given lordship of Storm's End. Gendry professes his love to Arya and proposes but Arya declines, not wanting the life of a lady.

Daenerys wrests control of King's Landing from Cersei Lannister, but burns the populace of the city after they surrender to her. Jon tries but fails to dissuade Daenerys from further destruction and ultimately assassinates her. With the deaths of Cersei and Daenerys, Westeros is left without a ruler. Gendry travels to King's Landing along with Westeros' other nobility to decide the future of the Seven Kingdoms. Tyrion proposes that Bran Stark be crowned king. Gendry, as the new lord of Storm's End, approves, along with the other lords, unanimously.

References

Sources
 

A Song of Ice and Fire characters
Fictional adoptees
Fictional knights
Fictional lords and ladies
Fictional revolutionaries
Fictional smiths
Fictional swordfighters
Literary characters introduced in 1996
Male characters in literature
Male characters in television
Orphan characters in literature
Television characters introduced in 2011